Breg may refer to:

Places

Slovenia
 Breg, Majšperk, settlement in the Municipality of Majšperk
 Breg, Mežica, settlement in the Municipality of Mežica
 Breg, Sevnica, settlement in the Municipality of Sevnica
 Breg, Žirovnica, village in the Municipality of Žirovnica
 Breg ob Bistrici, settlement in the Municipality of Tržič

Serbia
 Bački Breg, village

Croatia
 Breg, Croatia, village in Istria County

River
 Breg (river), river in Germany

Names
 Breg (Irish mythology), considered a classic Celtic Triple Goddess
 Cobthach Cóel Breg, high king of Ireland in the 6th century BC

Science
 Regulatory B cells (Bregs)